Pycnochelifer is a fossil genus of arachnids belonging to the family Cheliferidae.

The species of this genus are found in Europe.

Species:
 Pycnochelifer kleemanni (C.L.Koch & Berendt, 1854)

References

Cheliferidae
Prehistoric chelicerate genera